This is a list of events in Scottish television from 2007.

Events

January
7 January – Death of television presenter Magnus Magnusson, long-time presenter of the BBC's Mastermind.
 8 January – STV launches separate news services for the East and West of the STV Central region, initially as a five-minute opt out within the 6:00 pm edition of Scotland Today on weeknights. STV also launches two editions of North Tonight begin to receive two different programmes - those in the Dundee, Angus, Perthshire and north-east Fife area receive a dedicated bulletin within the main North Tonight programme.
10 January – Scottish Media Group and Belfast-based UTV agree the details of a merger, including a revised share split between the two. UTV will own 54% of the group, while SMG will take the remaining 46%. However, the deal is once again rejected at the end of February.

February
No events.

March
No events.

April
12 April – SMG Group plc announce plans to sell Virgin Radio, to enable the company to focus on its television station, STV.

May
3 May – Television coverage of the 2007 Scottish Parliament election.

June
7 June – The long-running Scottish Six debate over a separate BBC Six O'Clock News bulletin for Scotland is reignited after the Scottish National Party's Pete Wishart writes to the BBC Director General Mark Thompson calling for a Scottish news programme to be introduced.

July
18 July – It is announced that the Scottish Premier League has signed a deal with BBC Scotland for non-exclusive television coverage of the league.

August
August – The Scottish Government establishes the Scottish Broadcasting Commission to oversee television production and broadcasting in Scotland.
31 August – STV celebrates fifty years on air.

September
20 September – British Prime Minister Gordon Brown opens the BBC Scotland's new Pacific Quay studio complex in Glasgow. At the opening ceremony BBC Director-General Mark Thompson outlines plans to increase BBC Scotland's content output.

October
26 October – Inaugural meeting of the Scottish Broadcasting Commission. Chaired by Blair Jenkins the Commission hopes to take television in Scotland "to a different level".

November
No events.

December
3 December – News opt-outs for Scotland during GMTV are taken over by MacMillan Media following a long-running dispute between GMTV and STV. Previously STV and Grampian had provided local news coverage during GMTV.

Debuts

ITV
3 December – GMTV Scotland on STV (2007–present)

Television series
Scotsport (1957–2008)
Reporting Scotland (1968–1983; 1984–present)
Scotland Today (1972–2009)
Sportscene (1975–present)
The Beechgrove Garden (1978–present)
North Tonight (1980–2009)
Taggart (1983–2010)
Only an Excuse? (1993–2020)
River City (2002–present)
Politics Now (2004–2011)
VideoGaiden (2005–2008)
The Adventure Show (2005–present)
That Was The Team That Was (2006–2008)

Ending this year
31 December – Still Game (2002–2007; 2016–2019)

Deaths
7 January – Magnus Magnusson, 79, broadcaster and presenter
9 February – Ian Richardson, 72, actor

See also
2007 in Scotland

References

 
Television in Scotland by year
2000s in Scottish television